Australian nationalism asserts that the Australians are a nation and promotes the national and cultural unity of Australia. Australian nationalism has a history dating back to the late 19th century as Australia gradually developed a distinct culture and identity from that of Britain, beginning to view itself as a unique and separate entity and not simply an extension or a derivation of British culture and identity.

History

Pre-Federation
By the early 19th century, Australia was governed as a series of six largely self-governing colonies that were spread across the continent and were part of the British Empire. Attempts to coordinate governance had failed in the 1860s due to a lack of popular support and lack of interest from the British government, but by the 1880s, and with the rise of nationalist movements in Europe, the efforts to establish a federation of the Australian colonies began to gather momentum. The British government supported federation as a means to cement British influence in the South Pacific.

Nationalistic sentiments increased as a result of Australia's participation in the First and Second World Wars, with concepts such as "mateship" becoming a cornerstone of Australian nationalism.

Australian nationalist parties

Current
Australia First Party
Australian Protectionist Party
Katter's Australian Party
Pauline Hanson's One Nation
The Great Australian Party

Defunct
Advance Australia Party
Australian Nationalist Party
Centre Party
Fraser Anning's Conservative National Party
Love Australia or Leave
Nationalist Party
Reclaim Australia: Reduce Immigration
Rise Up Australia Party

Australian nationalist movements and groups

Active
Antipodean Resistance
Australian League of Rights
True Blue Crew
Lads Society

Defunct
Australia First Movement
Australian Natives' Association
New Guard
United Patriots' Front

Prominent Australian Nationalists

Historical
Henry Lawson
Banjo Patterson
Jack Lang
Percy Stephenson
Alexander Rud Mills
William Lane
Norman Lindsay
Frank Anstey
Ian Mudie
Rex Ingamells
William Baylebridge

Contemporary
Pauline Hanson
Jim Saleam
Fraser Anning

See also

Australian patriotism
Anzac spirit
Ultranationalism
White Australia policy
Reclaim Australia 
Reclaiming Patriotism
 Federation of Australia
 Foreign relations of Australia

Flags

Flags used by Australian Nationalists

References

 
Australian culture
Political terminology in Australia
Far-right politics in Australia